Demaratus, frequently called Demaratus of Corinth, was the father of Lucius Tarquinius Priscus, the fifth King of Rome, and the grandfather or great-grandfather of Lucius Tarquinius Superbus, the seventh and last Roman king.

Life
Demaratus was a Dorian nobleman and a member of the Corinthian house of the Bacchiadae. Facing charges of sedition, in 655 BC he fled to Italy, according to tradition settling in the Etruscan city of Tarquinii, where he married an Etruscan noblewoman.  They had two sons, Lucius and Arruns.

According to tradition, Demaratus introduced Greek culture to mainland Italy, and brought potters from Corinth; Greek potters worked at Tarquinii and its port, Gravisca.  Tacitus reported that Demaratus brought literacy to the Etruscans.  According to Pausanias, Demaratus' son or grandson was the first foreigner to visit Olympia, and make a dedication there.

Descendants
Through his sons, Demaratus was the ancestor of the Roman gens Tarquinia, and a forebear of several other notable Roman families.  By blood or marriage, his descendants included the last three kings of Rome, as well as the first two Roman consuls.

Demaratus had two sons, Lucius and Arruns Tarquinius.  Arruns died shortly before his father, who accordingly bequeathed all of his wealth to his remaining son, Lucius, unaware that Arruns' wife was pregnant with Demaratus' grandson.  Thus, in spite of his grandfather's wealth, the child, who was named Arruns after his father, was born into poverty.  For this reason, he came to be called Egerius, meaning "the needy one."

Like his father, Lucius Tarquinius married an Etruscan noblewoman, but as the son of a foreigner he was unable to attain high station at Tarquinii.  At the urging of his wife, Tanaquil, Tarquin migrated to Rome, where even a foreigner might hope to gain rank and influence.  There he won the favour of the king, Ancus Marcius, and when the king died, Tarquin was chosen to succeed him.  After subduing the Latin town of Collatia, the king placed his nephew, Arruns, in charge of the Roman garrison there.

Tarquin's daughter married Servius Tullius, who succeeded him as the sixth king of Rome.  After a long and prosperous reign, Tullius was deposed by his own son-in-law, Lucius Tarquinius Superbus, the son or grandson of the elder Tarquin.  An Etruscan legend told of how Servius, aided by the heroes Aulus and Caelius Vibenna, had defeated and killed a group of enemies, including a certain Gnaeus Tarquinius of Rome, perhaps the son of Tarquin the Elder and father of Tarquin the Proud.

Many of the leading figures on both sides in the establishment of the Roman Republic were descendants of Demaratus.  In addition to the king, the king's wife was a descendant of Demaratus as her mother was the daughter of the elder Tarquin; and their three sons played prominent roles in the unfolding of events.  It was the rape of Lucretia by Sextus Tarquinius that inspired the Roman nobles to rebel against the king; Arruns Tarquinius and the Roman consul Lucius Junius Brutus slew one another in the first great battle of the Roman Republic; and Titus Tarquinius narrowly avoided death at the Battle of Lake Regillus.  The Latin army that marched against the Romans on that occasion was commanded by Octavius Mamilius, the dictator of Tusculum, and a son-in-law of Tarquin's.

Meanwhile, the first two consuls were each descendants of Demaratus; Brutus' mother was the king's sister, while his colleague was Lucius Tarquinius Collatinus, the son of Egerius, and husband of Lucretia.  Before his death at the hands of Titus Tarquinius, Brutus compelled his colleague to resign and go into exile, arguing that none of the Tarquinian gens should hold power at Rome.

Three important Roman gentes claimed descent from Demaratus; the Junii, through the first consul; the Mamilii, who came to Rome from Tusculum in the fifth century BC; and the Tullii, through Servius Tullius.

Primary sources 
 Livy, Ab urbe condita, 1:34
 Pausanias, Guide to Greece, tr. P. Levi, Penguin, 1979.
 Pliny, Natural History
 Tacitus, The Annals of Imperial Rome, tr. M. Grant, Penguin, 1996.

Secondary sources 
 Ampolo, Carmine (1976/1977) "Demarato: Osservazioni sulla mobilità sociale arcaica", Dialoghi di Archeologia 9-10: 333–345.
 Blakeway, Alan (1935) "Demaratus: A Study in Some Aspects of the Earliest Hellenisation of Latium and Etruria," Journal of Roman Studies 25, 129–149.
 Brendel, Otto J. (1995) Etruscan Art. New Haven & London: Yale University Press/Pelican History of Art. 
 Morkot, R., The Penguin Historical Atlas of Ancient Greece. Penguin, 1996.
 Ridgway, David & Ridgway, Francesca R. (1994) "Demaratus and the Archaeologists" in Murlo and the Etruscans: art and society in ancient Etruria (ed. Richard Daniel De Puma & Jocelyn Penny Small), 6–15. Madison, Wisconsin: The University of Wisconsin Press.
 Scullard, Howard H. (1980) A history of the Roman world, 753-146 B.C. 4th ed. London: Methuen.
 Williams, Charles K. (1978) Demaratus and Early Corinthian Roofs. STELE (N.Kontoleon-juhlakirja), 345–350. Ateena.
 Winter, Nancy A. (2002) "Commerce in Exile: Terracotta Roofing in Etruria, Corfu and Sicily, a Bacchiad Family Enterprise", Etruscan Studies 9, 227–236.

External links
see Lucretia 2
see Lucius Tarquinius Priscus

Ancient Greeks in Rome
Ancient Corinthians
Ancient Greek pottery
7th-century BC Greek people